Bruno Franceschetti (born 30 April 1941) is a retired Italian gymnast. He competed at the 1964 and 1968 Olympics in all artistic gymnastics events and finished in 4th and 12th place with the Italian team, respectively. His best individual result was 36th place on the pommel horse in 1968. Franceschetti won a gold medal with the Italian team at the 1967 Mediterranean Games.

After retiring from competitions Franceschetti worked as gymnastics coach. Jury Chechi was one of his trainees.

References

1941 births
Living people
Gymnasts at the 1964 Summer Olympics
Gymnasts at the 1968 Summer Olympics
Olympic gymnasts of Italy
Italian male artistic gymnasts
Mediterranean Games medalists in gymnastics
Mediterranean Games gold medalists for Italy
Competitors at the 1967 Mediterranean Games